Philipp Buhl (born 19 December 1989) is a German competitive sailor. He competed at the 2016 Summer Olympics in Rio de Janeiro, in the men's Laser class, finishing in 14th place.

In 2021, Buhl competed at the delayed 2020 Summer Olympics in the men's Laser class, finishing in 5th place.

His best result to date came in 2020, when he placed 1st at the ILCA Laser Standard Men's World Championship.

Buhl is currently ranked 5th in the ILCA 7 men's rankings.

References

External links
 
 
 
 
 
 

1989 births
Living people
German male sailors (sport)
Olympic sailors of Germany
Sailors at the 2016 Summer Olympics – Laser
Sailors at the 2020 Summer Olympics – Laser